The 192nd Battalion, CEF, was a unit in the Canadian Expeditionary Force during the First World War. Authorization published in General Order 69 to recruit the 192nd Battalion was issued on 15 July 1916. Organization of the battalion took place in Blairmore, Alberta, and the surrounding district in January 1916 under the command of Lieutenant-Colonel Henry Edward Lyon. The total strength of the 192nd Battalion was 23 officers and 424 soldiers of other ranks. After sailing to England in November 1916, the battalion was absorbed into the 9th Reserve Battalion on November 12, 1916. They were disbanded by Privy Council Order 2702 on 12 October 1917.

Perpetuation of the 192nd Battalion was assigned to the North Alberta Regiment in 1924. The North Albertas disbanded in 1936.

In 1929, the battalion was awarded the theatre of war honour .

References
 

Battalions of the Canadian Expeditionary Force
Military units and formations of Alberta